"Bad Things" is a song written and recorded by American singer Jace Everett. It is included on his only album for Epic Records Nashville, the self-titled Jace Everett. Although released as a single in 2005, it did not chart on the Hot Country Songs charts that year. The song charted in the United Kingdom, Norway, and Sweden in 2009 after it was selected as the theme song for the HBO series True Blood.

Critical reception
Stephen Thomas Erlewine, in his review of the album for Allmusic, compared the song in theme to Chris Isaak's "Baby Did a Bad, Bad Thing", saying that it was "less menacing and a little rowdier" than that song.

Use in media
In 2008, it was selected as the theme song for HBO's vampire series True Blood. It won a 2009 Broadcast Music Incorporated award in the cable television category and was nominated for a 2009 Scream Award for "Best Scream Song of the Year".

Chart performance

References

Jace Everett songs
2005 singles
Television drama theme songs
True Blood
Epic Records singles
Rockabilly songs
Swamp rock songs
Songs written by Jace Everett
Song recordings produced by Mark Wright (record producer)
Song recordings produced by Greg Droman